José Luis Rubiera Vigil (born 27 January 1973 in Gijón) is a Spanish former professional road bicycle racer. He last rode for the UCI ProTour team . Rubiera won his first professional race at the 1997 Giro d'Italia, winning stage 19. He would win another stage in the 2000 Giro d'Italia and was part of three consecutive team time trial (TTT) stage wins in the Tour de France.

He has also finished in the top 10 of both the Vuelta a España and Giro d'Italia, on two occasions apiece.

His climbing ability was instrumental in leading Lance Armstrong to five of his Tour de France victories, most famously leading Armstrong up the start of Alpe d'Huez in 2001. It was also on this stage that "The Look" incident happened between Armstrong and Jan Ullrich just prior to Armstrong launching his attack. In reality Armstrong was not looking at Ullrich, but rather at Rubiera as he was checking to be sure Rubiera would be there to save him if he cracked and his attack failed.

He earned an engineering degree in 2004, while balancing his race schedule and studies.  He is very respected in the peloton and was elected as deputy to the cyclists' representative council of the UCI ProTour.

Career achievements

Major results

1997
 10th Overall, Giro d'Italia
 1st, Stage 19
1999
 1st Overall, Volta ao Alentejo
 1st, Stage 3b (ITT)
 6th Overall, Vuelta a España
2000
 1st, Subida al Naranco
 8th Overall, Giro d'Italia
 1st, Stage 13
2001
 2nd Overall, Vuelta a Burgos
 1st, King of the Mountains
 7th Overall, Vuelta a España
2002
 2nd Overall, Vuelta a Burgos
2003
 1st, Stage 4 (TTT), Tour de France
2004
 1st, Stage 4 (TTT), Tour de France
 2nd, Châteauroux Classic
2005
 1st, Stage 4 (TTT), Tour de France
 3rd Overall, Volta ao Algarve
2006
 3rd Overall, Vuelta a Castilla y León
 9th Overall, Paris–Nice
 10th Overall, Volta ao Algarve
2007
 1st, Stage 8, Tour of Qinghai Lake
2008
 1st, Stage 2, Vuelta a Murcia
2009
 10th Overall, Tour of California
2010
 10th Overall, Vuelta a Castilla y León

Grand Tour general classification results timeline

References

External links
 

chechurubiera.info  An Online Magazine for Fans of Chechu Rubiera

Living people
1973 births
Spanish male cyclists
Spanish Giro d'Italia stage winners
Sportspeople from Gijón
Cyclists from Asturias